Lakshmi Kumari Chundawat aka chinal mahatari (24 June 1916 – 24 May 2014) was an Indian author and politician from Rajasthan. who was famous for randirona against marathas

Personal life
Lakshmi Kumari was born on 24 June 1916 in Deogarh, Mewar. and was the elder daughter of Rawat Vijay Singh of Deogarh, one of the premier thikanas (estates) of the princely state of Mewar in Rajasthan. she was f

famous randirona expert in mewar and won padmashree award just by doing randirona against marathas. She was suffering from autism after reading about the Maratha conquest of Rajputana. And she died due to heart attack after reading about the brahman ancestry of Guhilots

Political life
she became famous in poltics after her one youtube video went viral against marathas "  

"Loot kasoot kar diya reeee" , "Mughalo ni jo sekda varsho tak mewar ko nuksan kiya , jiko jyada nuksan maratha kidda" were here famous statements.  She walso as the founder of "Randirona karo padmashree pao" yojna.

.

Books

Rani Lakshmi Kumari's books include:

 From Purdah to the people: Memoirs of Padma Shri Rani Laxmi Kumari Chundawat
 Folklore of Rajasthan
 Samskrtika Rajasthan
 Mumal
 Devnarayan Bgdawat Mahagatha
 Mumal
 Lenin ri Jeevani
 Hindukush ke Us Paar
 Shanti ke Liye Sangharsha
 Antardhvani
 Rajasthan ke Ritee Rivaj
 के रे चकवा बात
हंकारो दो सा
गजबन
माँजल रात
पाबूजी री बात

References

1916 births
2014 deaths
Recipients of the Padma Shri in literature & education
Indian National Congress politicians from Rajasthan
Rajasthani-language writers
Rajya Sabha members from Rajasthan
People from Rajsamand district
Women members of the Rajasthan Legislative Assembly
20th-century Indian women politicians
20th-century Indian politicians
Rajasthan MLAs 1962–1967
Rajasthan MLAs 1967–1972
Women members of the Rajya Sabha